DarkMaus is an action role-playing video game developed by Daniel Wright. The game was released for Microsoft Windows via Steam on January 26, 2016.

Plot 
Dark Maus is set in the world of Hazath, which has become corrupted. It follows a lone mouse who sets out to discover what has happened.

Gameplay 
In Dark Maus, the combat is skill based. Weapons include swords and bows, and the player has the ability to shoot fireballs. As enemies will be much more powerful than the player, they will need to devise strategies to defeat them. The player will be punished for being greedy. When the player dies, a ghost character will appear to assist the player. Over time, the player can collect multiple ghosts, and choose which of their weapons they would like to use. The game begins with a steep difficulty curve, with the intention being for the player to be thoughtful about how to progress. There are multiple playstyles for the player to adopt, each with their own strengths and weaknesses.

Development 
DarkMaus concept was inspired by the Dark Souls series. The developer kept a blog in which they detailed the development process of the game. The first entry was added on March 6, 2014. An early version was released on Steam on September 10, 2015. It was designed to be played on an Xbox controller.

Reception 
DarkMaus holds an aggregated Metacritic score of 83/100 based on 5 critic reviews. Hardcore Gamer awarded it a score of 4 out of 5, saying "In DarkMaus, Daniel Wright has created a focused, challenging experience that successfully translates the core tenets of Dark Souls."

References

External links 
 

2016 video games
Action role-playing video games
Fictional mice and rats
Dark fantasy video games
Soulslike video games
Role-playing video games
Video games about mice and rats
Video games developed in the United States
Windows games